Randwick was an Australian electoral district of the Legislative Assembly in the Australian state of New South Wales, originally created with the abolition of multi-member constituencies in 1894 from part of Paddington, along with Waverley and Woollahra. It was named after and including the Sydney suburb of Randwick. In 1920, with the introduction of proportional representation, it was absorbed into Eastern Suburbs. Randwick was recreated in 1927 and abolished in 1971 and partly replaced by Waverley.

Members for Randwick

Election results

References

Former electoral districts of New South Wales
Constituencies established in 1894
1894 establishments in Australia
Constituencies disestablished in 1904
1904 disestablishments in Australia